Jeff Jordan is an American painter in Eureka, California. He is best known for the artwork he has provided for rock band The Mars Volta.

His painting Big Mutant serves as the cover artwork for the album Amputechture by The Mars Volta, and his painting Dwarf Dancing is printed on the CD face and LP labels of the same album. His painting Agadez serves as the cover art for The Mars Volta's fourth studio album, The Bedlam in Goliath, and it is also the name of the eighth track on the same album. The band's fifth studio album, Octahedron, features Jordan's artwork on the front and back covers as well as throughout the LP packaging. He has also created t-shirts and live backdrops for the band.

His cover for The Bedlam in Goliath was named by Rolling Stone readers as the 2nd best album cover of 2008 .

Album artwork credits

The Mars Volta 
Amputechture (2006)
Wax Simulacra (2007)
The Bedlam in Goliath (2008)
Octahedron (2009)

Gama Bomb 
Tales from the Grave in Space (2009)

Leprous 
Bilateral (2011)
Coal (2013)

Protest the Hero 
Volition (2013)

External links
  (requires Adobe Flash)

21st-century American painters
21st-century American male artists
Living people
Year of birth missing (living people)
Album-cover and concert-poster artists
American male painters